Paūliai is a village in Varėna District Municipality, Alytus County, in southeastern Lithuania. According to the 2021 census, the village had a population of 27 people. 
In 1921–1945, the village was within the borders of the Second Polish Republic.

References

Villages in Varėna District Municipality